Sofia Tekela-Smith (born 1960) is a New Zealand artist specialising in jewellery and body adornments. Her work is held in the permanent collections of Auckland Art Gallery Toi o Tāmaki and Museum of New Zealand Te Papa Tongarewa.

Life 
Tekela-Smith was born in Auckland, New Zealand, in 1970 to Meriama Sauitu, who was from the island of Rotuma, and John Smith, from Glasgow, Scotland. Tekela-Smith and her brother were raised on Rotuma by their maternal grandmother Mue Tekela until her death in the early 1980s, when they returned to Auckland to live with their mother.

Tekela-Smith's jewellery uses traditional materials such as bone, shell and stone. She first exhibited in 1993 in Tufa'atasi, a fashion show at the International Festival of the Arts in Wellington. In 1996 her work was included in some group shows in Auckland and she also performed with Pacific Sisters at the Seventh South Pacific Festival of the Arts in Apia, Samoa.

Her work has been exhibited in both solo and group shows including a show at Macleay Museum, University of Sydney in 1999; the 3rd New Zealand Jewellery Biennial at Auckland Museum in 2000; and the exhibition Pacific Adornment at Te Papa in 2002. Her jewellery has also been shown in Germany, at Haus der Kulturen der Welt, and in New York.

References

1970 births
Living people
21st-century New Zealand artists
21st-century New Zealand women artists
People from Auckland
New Zealand people of Rotuman descent
New Zealand people of Scottish descent